Froude is an unincorporated community in the Canadian province of Saskatchewan, located in the Rural Municipality of Griffin No. 66, along the historic Ghost Town Trail, also known as the Red Coat Trail or Highway 13. The community is located approximately 42 km east of the city of Weyburn and 137 km southeast of the provincial capital city of Regina.

History

Froude is named after the English historian James Anthony Froude.

The post office opened on June 1, 1908, in a private dwelling, Section 27, Township 8, Range 10, W2. On December 31, 1969, the post office shut its doors.

Demographics

The community of Froude had a peak population of 200 citizens in 1920–21. It has struggled over the years to maintain a steady population and has now become a semi–ghost town, with few residents remaining.

Businesses

Froude once a had a booming economy with a variety of businesses such as Canadian Pacific Railway telegraph and Dominion Express services, two grain elevators, Federal Grain Co. and North Star Grain Co. offices, a bank, a hardware store, a general store, a blacksmith, and a Presbyterian church.

Location geography

Education

Froude School District No. 1896 was organized in the fall of 1907 and closed in June 1970.

Notable citizens

 Jack Yateman, was awarded the bronze medal, the highest award to be given to a Boy Scout. He received this award at the age of 16, after saving the life of his patrol leader, E. Fox, during a swimming incident at a Scout camp at Bear Lake.

See also

 List of communities in Saskatchewan

References

Griffin No. 66, Saskatchewan
Unincorporated communities in Saskatchewan
Division No. 2, Saskatchewan